Toboso may refer to:

Toboso people, an indigenous group of Chihuahua
Toboso, Negros Occidental, a municipality in the Philippines
El Toboso, a municipality in Castile-La Mancha, Spain
Toboso, Ohio, unincorporated community in Licking County, Ohio, United States
Yana Toboso, author of Kuroshitsuji/Black Butler